"Modern Day Bonnie and Clyde" is a song written by Walt Aldridge and James LeBlanc, and recorded by American country music artist Travis Tritt.  It was released in January 2002 as the fourth and final single from his album Down the Road I Go.  It peaked at number 8, and is his last top ten hit to date.

Content
The song describes a man who meets a woman at a truck stop in Johnson City, Tennessee. After leaving town, the woman robs a convenience store, and tells the man to drive away. Then later that night, after heading north on Interstate 95, the man and the woman are both arrested counting the money in a motel room in Richmond, Virginia.

Critical reception
Chuck Taylor, of Billboard magazine reviewed the song favorably saying that the song has a "swampy, hypnotic appeal that commands attention." He goes on to say that "the retro intro in this engaging musical outing serves notice that there is something cool and quite different in the air."

Music video
The music video was directed by Michael Merriman, was filmed in California, instead of Tennessee and Virginia, like in the song's lyric, and features actor Billy Bob Thornton, who plays the man. The woman comes up to him at a truck stop and asks for a ride. The woman then robs a convenience store, and asks the man to drive away as the clerk is chasing her down. The man tells her that robbing the store was a big deal, while the woman thought that it was no big deal. He wonders what she was doing with a gun, and he also wonders how much money is in one of her bags. Later that night, at a motel, they're counting all the money, and enjoying themselves, at least until the police arrives, and the man and the woman are both arrested. The woman tries to fool one of the cops into letting her go, but the cop doesn't buy it. Travis Tritt plays the tow truck driver, who tows the man's car away with the man looking at it being towed away, and looking ashamed. In between these scenes, Tritt and 2 band members are also seen performing the song in an office setting.

Chart positions
"Modern Day Bonnie and Clyde" debuted at number fifty-six on the U.S. Billboard Hot Country Singles & Tracks for the week of January 12, 2002.

Year-end charts

References

Allmusic
CMT
Music Video at CMT.com

2000 songs
Travis Tritt songs
2002 singles
Songs written by Walt Aldridge
Song recordings produced by Billy Joe Walker Jr.
Columbia Records singles
Songs about Bonnie and Clyde